Lakhan Lal Dewangan (born 12 April 1962) is an Indian politician and former Parliamentary secretary (Minister of State rank) in Government of Chhattisgarh. He is Vice President of Bharatiya Janata Party, Chhattisgarh.

Political career 
Lakhan Lal Dewangan was first elected as Mayor of Korba Municipal Corporation in 2005. On 8 December 2013, Dewangan became Member of Chhattisgarh Legislative Assembly from Katghora Constituency by defeating Bodhram Kanwar of Indian National Congress, a six term MLA from same seat by 13,130 votes and became Parliamentary secretary (Minister of State rank) for Food, Civil Supply, Consumer Protection, Village Industry, Planning, Economic and Statistics in Raman Singh Third ministry.
Again, Dewangan contested the 2018 Assembly election against Purushottam Kanwar (INC) for Katghora but lost to Kanwar by 11,511 votes.

References

Bharatiya Janata Party politicians from Chhattisgarh
Chhattisgarh MLAs 2013–2018
1962 births
Living people